Fatalities from wingsuit flying have occurred almost from the inception of the sport. Below are listed the most notable ones, including when wingsuit practice was not the first cause of death.

References

Air sports
Parachuting deaths
BASE jumping deaths
Wingsuit flight deaths